John McGuire (October 22, 1910 – September 30, 1980) was a film actor during the period from the 1930s to the 1950s. In many of his early films he was a leading man; however, later in his career he played bit parts. McGuire appeared in Steamboat Round the Bend (1935);  Charlie Chan at the Circus (1936);The Prisoner of Shark Island (1936); Stranger on the Third Floor (1940), sometimes thought Hollywood's first film noir; The Invisible Ghost (1941); Sands of Iwo Jima (1949); and Where the Sidewalk Ends (1950).

Partial filmography

References

External links

American male film actors
1910 births
1980 deaths
20th-century American male actors